Vipera anatolica, commonly known as the Anatolian meadow viper, is a species of venomous snake of the family Viperidae.

Geographic range
The snake is found in southwestern Turkey.

References

Reptiles described in 1970
Reptiles of Turkey
anatolica